Meyersville is an unincorporated community in DeWitt County, Texas.

History
The first settlement at Meyersville was made in 1846 by Adolph Meyer, who gave the town his name. The community was originally built up chiefly by Germans. A post office was established at Meyersville in 1851.  The Pakebusch Family Reunion is held annually in Meyersville on the first Saturday in August.

Education
The Meyersville Independent School District serves area students in grades pre-kindergarten through eight. Ninth through twelfth grade students attend Cuero High School in the Cuero Independent School District.

References

Unincorporated communities in Texas
Unincorporated communities in DeWitt County, Texas